John Marshall Blust (born June 4, 1954) is a  former Republican member of the North Carolina General Assembly, representing the state's sixty-second House district, including constituents in Guilford county.  An attorney from Greensboro, North Carolina, Blust has previously served terms in both the state House and Senate. He is a lawyer and a former U.S. Army captain.

Blust was defeated for reelection to his N.C. Senate seat by Kay Hagan, who would go on to be elected to the United States Senate.

In March 2016, Blust officially announced his candidacy for the United States House of Representatives for North Carolina's newly redrawn 13th District. He was defeated in the Republican primary by Ted Budd.

Blust did not seek re-election to the North Carolina General Assembly in 2018.

Election history

2016

2014

2012

2010

2008

2006

2004

2002

2000

References

External links

|-

|-

Republican Party members of the North Carolina House of Representatives
Republican Party North Carolina state senators
Living people
1954 births
Place of birth missing (living people)
21st-century American politicians